Clare Melford was the CEO of the International Business Leaders Forum from November 2010 until she stepped down in November 2012.

She graduated from Oxford University and trained as a management consultant at Marakon Associates. She worked as general manager for MTV Nordic for eight years.   She took a leadership role in the transition of the European Council on Foreign Relations to independent status from previously being a part of George Soros' Open Society Foundations.

She has been CEO of the Global Disinformation Index (GDI), a not-for-profit organisation which provides disinformation risk ratings, but in 2020 the subject was listed as secretary with no compensation in federal tax filings.

She explained in a talk delivered to the Royal Society of Arts that it was while she was general manager of the Nordic region of MTV that she developed a critical understanding of how the media station provided a supportive selling environment for unsustainable lifestyles, which led to her giving up that position and becoming interested in Buddhism.

References

Living people
English Buddhists
Converts to Buddhism
Year of birth missing (living people)